Joh (pronounced jooh) is a village located in Una district, in the Indian state of Himachal Pradesh. Joh's population was 851 as of 2011, of which 416 are male and 435 are female. The village is also near Pong Dam, Chintpurni temple.

References

Villages in Una district